Americus Mayo (died 1891) was a state legislator in Arkansas. Scholars have had difficulty confirming details about his life. He voted against the impeachment of Arkansas Supreme Court Justice John McClure. He served in the Arkansas House of Representatives. He was a Republican.

References

Year of birth missing
1891 deaths
Members of the Arkansas House of Representatives